Rahul Kanojia (born 26 December 1994) is an Indian first-class cricketer who plays for Services.

References

External links
 

1994 births
Living people
Indian cricketers
Services cricketers
Cricketers from Amritsar